Heart Lake may refer to the following places:

In Canada:
Heart Lake (Ontario), located in the northern end of Brampton, Ontario
Heart Lake Secondary School, in Brampton, Ontario
Heart Lake Terminal, a Brampton Transit bus terminal
Heart Lake First Nation, a First Nations band in northern Alberta
Heart Lake 167 and Heart Lake 167A, two Indian reserves of Heart Lake First Nation

In the United States:
Heart Lake (Arapaho National Forest), in Arapaho National Forest, Colorado
Heart Lake (Idaho), in the Sawtooth Wilderness
Heart Lake (Michigan)
Heart Lake (Minnesota)
Heart Lake (Beaverhead County, Montana), in Beaverhead County, Montana
Heart Lake (Carbon County, Montana), in Carbon County, Montana
Heart Lake (Missoula County, Montana), in Missoula County, Montana
Heart Lake (Soldier Mountains), in Camas County, Idaho
Heart Lake (Stillwater County, Montana), in Stillwater County, Montana
Heart Lake (New York), located in the Adirondack Park near the Adirondak Loj
Heart Lake (White Cloud Mountains), in Custer County, Idaho
Heart Lake (Wyoming), located in Yellowstone National Park